Chris Traynor (born June 22, 1973) is an American musician, songwriter and producer, best known as the lead guitarist of the rock band Bush since 2001. Prior to Bush, he started in the post-hardcore scene with Fountainhead and Orange 9mm. “I got a publishing and record deal when I was nineteen, just super young.” Traynor had an on and off stint with Helmet while overlapping his Gavin Rossdale based projects of Bush, Institute, and Gavin Rossdale's solo album. Traynor played in two bands with his partner Sibyl Buck, Champions of Sound (as a touring member)  and High Desert Fires.

Traynor has performed live with the British rock band Blur, recorded bass and guitars on Katy Perry's "Use Your Love" with producer Junior Sanchez, and recorded guitars for Peter Green of Fleetwood Mac and producer Dave Stewart. Traynor has done studio work with Blue Man Group and indie rock band Rival Schools. “When I played bass for Blur and had to learn 24 songs in 24 hours or something like that.”

Traynor is currently living in Los Angeles and is touring with Bush. He continually produces and writes music including soundtrack and television music.

Early Life
Traynor's family was rooted in Queens, New York where he grew up.  “My father is from Howard Beach, my mother is from Ozone Park, and I was born in Rosedale: the trifecta of Queens.”

His parent enrolled him in the first Suzuki method music programs in New York City. Shinichi Suzuki was a Japanese music teacher who had a very successful teaching program in Japan and brought it over to the United States, basically teaching music as a language. He would teach to very young children and Traynor's experience of it was when he was very, very young. His parents would to take him to the city, have a violin sitting on a blanket by him and they’d play classical music. “You learn how to deal with music in terms of like a language.”

Music Career

Background
Traynor has studied guitar with Mark Lonergan from Band of Susans, Richard Lloyd of the rock band Television, Robert Fripp's Guitar Craft, and bluegrass phenomenon Michael Daves.

Producing and writing

In addition to his writing credits with Bush on chart topping songs “Flower On A Grave” and “More Than Machines”, Traynor has written and produced tracks for bands such as Grey Daze (Amends featuring Chester Bennington of Linkin Park), BRKN Love and the Los Angeles based band Dorothy. Chris also has written and produced songs with his former bands Institute, Rival Schools, Helmet and Orange 9mm.

Fountainhead (1993-1994)
Traynor played with this post-hardcore band in New York City that only released one album titled Drain.

Orange 9mm (1992-1996)
He cut his teeth in the early 1990s post-hardcore scene. “When we started Orange 9mm, it was like two really broke kids in a tiny apartment in New York City trying to communicate with each other.” As a founding member of the band Orange 9mm, Traynor developed a unique style of guitar and bass in the studio. “I gotta say looking back in a lot of ways, I think there's a lot of odd time signatures and the tunings are different and modified; the chord voicings are different. I wasn't intentionally going for that but I do think it was fairly progressive especially for the time.” Alongside Chaka Malik, Traynor went on to record three albums with the band including Orange 9mm, Driver Not Included and Tragic. For their third album Traynor switched to playing bass. “All the songs that I wrote for Orange 9mm, I wrote on bass. I wrote the bass lines off the first record, too. I bought a 70s stripped down Jazz bass and I would sit in the corner and smoke cigarettes.  When Davide [Gentile] left, I just felt like, well, I'll record the bass and it'll be closer to what the original intention was and we'll find a bass player later.” Before the touring for Tragic began, Traynor departed to play with another popular band, Helmet.

Helmet (1996-1998; 2004-2006; 2010)
Originally recruited as touring guitarist in support of their fourth studio album, Aftertaste. “Going to Helmet was an amazing move for me. I just played with the band and we did a week of rehearsals and he [Page Hamilton] showed up for the last one. Then we flew to Austria to play a huge festival in Trikke. I knew those songs and I felt like they were in my blood and Page was happy to not have to pay attention so much to what I was doing. He felt comfortable with me.” Traynor had worked on-and-off with the band for ten years throughout the band's breakup and reuniting, before departing himself in 2006. He later returned in 2010 to help record their album Seeing Eye Dog. “I think that record was a weird time certainly for Page and I. It's the only record that we've actually talked about rerecording. In my opinion and maybe Page would be mad at me for saying this but I think that record was rushed and some of those songs are the best songs that he's written. I went in and I did my tracks and I left so it wasn't as enjoyable as I thought it would be.”

Bush (2001-present)

While on tour with Helmet, Traynor was noticed by producer Dave Sardy and recommended as a potential new guitarist in 2002 for rock band Bush.  “He (Dave Sardy) said, ‘What are you doing right now?’ and I said, ‘Nothing’. And he said, ‘There's a band that's looking for a guitar player. I'm gonna have them give you a call’. I knew he was working with Slayer so I thought it was Slayer.” Bush's original guitarist, Nigel Pulsford, had recently retired to spend more time with his family. Traynor joined in the middle of the Golden State Tour taking over for Nigel. “I have to be honest in saying that I wasn't entirely familiar with their catalog. I had known some of their songs and they said, ‘Come down and meet us and if we get a vibe from you we'll fly you to Philadelphia’.” The tour wrapped in July and Bush went on pause for a number of years.

In May 2010, it was announced that Bush would be touring once again. The Sea Of Memories was released in 2011. “I really feel proud of the guitar stuff that I've done on the record and some of the songs on there are really amazing.” The album features the single "The Sound Of Winter" which achieved moderate commercial success on several North America charts. “It's such a strong song and his [Gavin Rossdale] voice sounds so great and there's a vibe to that song.” On October 18, 2011, it topped the Alternative Songs chart, knocking off "Walk" by the Foo Fighters. Not only was it the band's fifth No. 1 hit single on the chart (their first in 12 years, since 1999's "The Chemicals Between Us"), but it also became the first self-released single to reach No. 1 on the Alternative radio chart. On November 19, it topped the Rock Songs chart and became their first No. 1 song on the chart. 

Chris has completed five studio albums with Bush since becoming a permanent fixture. Traynor is credited for song writing on The Kingdom and The Art Of Survival.

Rival Schools (2003)
In between Helmet's down time and Bush's break, Traynor joined up with Rival Schools. Rival Schools longtime guitarist, Ian Love, had left the band in 2002 making way for Traynor. The band recorded a bunch of songs together, but never released an album. “So I was looking for an opportunity to play with him [Walter Schreifels] but it didn't pan out the way that I had hoped because his heart wasn't in it at the time and obviously that record never came out [a second album that is still unreleased].Some of those songs are out on this new record (Pedals) that they just put out.” By September 2003, the band split and Traynor along with bandmate Cache Tolman headed off to do a new project with a familiar friend, Gavin Rossdale.

Institute (2003-2005)

After touring as a member of Bush, Traynor and singer Gavin Rossdale began writing songs for a different project, which would later become Institute. It was the first time Traynor ever recorded with Gavin Rossdale. Traynor would reconnect with Page Hamilton who produced their first and only studio album titled Distort Yourself. “It was a real process to get what we were doing right and Page Hamilton produced that record so it was like having your two big brothers in the studio with you and trying to make em both happy.” The album received only mild success on the airwaves. “I loved the way that record sounds but it didn't do what we thought it would do but I'm really kinda proud of it and the production on it I think sounds great and the songs are really strong.” They toured throughout the United States, even opening for heavy hitter's U2 and then onto Europe before finally calling it quits in 2005.

Gavin Rossdale (2005-2010)
The culmination of the time Traynor spent with Rossdale resulted in the release of Rossdale's solo record WANDERlust, produced by Bob Rock. Taking more of an accompanist position in the band, Traynor's approach was different this go. “What I do is I put the guitar down, I listen to the track and I try to hear what the part would be and then I pick up the guitar and I kind of figure out the part rather than having a view of it.” “It wasn't until Gavin and I started doing the solo record that we really started to spread out.” The album featured the hit single "Love Remains The Same" that reached No. 2 on the US Adult Pop Songs (Billboard) and remained there for four weeks. The song was No. 1 on iTunes rock chart and sold nearly two million copies worldwide. WANDERlust had nationwide success in the United States. Traynor toured in support of the album in 2008 and 2009.

High Desert Fires (2013-2015)

Traynor's side project, a six piece band based out of his local Topanga community formed spontaneously. Including his partner Sibyl Buck. "In a way I wanted to be able to express myself in a different way that I'm used to expressing it, in a different genre." Though recorded in a fairly short time it took over two years to finish the album. They released one album digitally Light Is The Revelation and played a handful of shows locally in Topanga. On this project he used a number of unconventional instruments.

Equipment

Traynor's first guitar was a pre-Gibson Epiphone devon arch-top that originally belonged to his great-grandfather. “Which I got out of my great-grandmother's closet in Brooklyn when we were moving her out of her apartment. It had Jazz strings on it.”

Traynor has been using the main 1973 Les Paul Custom he's had since was 18 years old. “I’ve used that on pretty much every record I’ve ever played on. I was on my way to pay the rent at the apartment we were subletting, and I stopped by Carmine Street Guitars, where they had a used 1973 Les Paul Custom. It was $850, which was exactly what my rent was, so I walked in and I used the rent money to buy the guitar.”

Collaborations
A project came about via Chris Coco and Sacha Puttnam while they were working with Peter Green of Fleetwood Mac. They had Traynor join in. “I recorded on a song with Peter Green for a song that came out on The Best of Peter Green's Fleetwood Mac album. It was a remake of "Albatross" and it was while I was staying in England in-between Bush tours.”

Musical Influences
As an early teen Traynor was into King Crimson and Pat Metheny, which was brought about by a neighbor who was taking guitar lessons from an original Guitar Crafts group member. Traynor was also mesmerized by Jane’s Addiction and Jimi Hendrix. “I collect Hendrix bootlegs; all of those guys growing up was my first thing.”

As he moved forward in his musical career he would look to records like (No Pussyfooting) by Fripp & Eno, that he kept longest in his life.

Like many other Traynor thinks of The Beatles as a favorite. “I mean The Beatles 1 hits record is the first CD in my car; I listen to The Beatles all the time and everyday. Yeah, that stuff was a huge influence on me. When my daughter was born, I put down the guitar for a month and I would listen to Beatles' records first on the left and then on the right to kind of hear all the parts. I got way deep into The Beatles.”

Discography
With Fountainhead
 1993 Drain

With Orange 9mm
 1994 Orange 9mm
 1995 Driver Not Included
 1996 Tragic

With Helmet
2004 Size Matters
2006 Monochrome
2010 Seeing Eye Dog (including on bonus disc Helmet live in San Francisco at the Warped Tour July 8, 2006)

With Fleetwood Mac
2002 The Best of Peter Green's Fleetwood Mac (guitar textures on “Albatross”)

With Institute
2005 Distort Yourself

With Gavin Rossdale
2008 WANDERlust

With Rival Schools
2011 Pedals
2013 Found (guitar, tracks from unreleased follow up to United By Fate)

With Bush
2011 The Sea of Memories
2014 Man on the Run
2017 Black and White Rainbows
2020 The Kingdom
2022 The Art of Survival

With High Desert Fires 
2015 Light Is the Revelation

With Grey Daze 
2020 Amends (producer & musician credits “Just Like Heroin”, “What's In The Eye”, “Sometimes” and musician credit “Soul Song”)

With BRKN Love
2020 BRKN Love (writing credit on “Shot Down”)

With Dorothy
2022 Gifts From The Holy Ghost (writing credit on “Big Guns”)

References

External links
 Bush Fansite
 Institute Fansite

1973 births
American punk rock guitarists
American rock guitarists
American male guitarists
Bush (British band) members
Living people
People from Long Island
Helmet (band) members
21st-century American guitarists
21st-century American male musicians